The Gallic acid reagent is used as a simple spot-test to presumptively identify drug precursor chemicals. It is composed of a mixture of gallic acid and concentrated sulfuric acid.

0.05 g of gallic acid is used for every 10 mls of sulfuric acid. The same ratio of gallic acid n-propyl ester in sulfuric acid can also be used.

Because of its short shelf life (changing to pale violet color) it is sometimes prepared by dissolving gallic acid into ethanol and adding the sulfuric acid at the time of testing from a separate bottle. In this case 100 mL ethanol is used and one drop of sulfuric acid is used per drop of gallic acid in ethanol.

See also
Drug checking
Liebermann–Burchard test
Dille–Koppanyi reagent
Folin's reagent
Froehde reagent
Mandelin reagent
Marquis reagent
Mecke reagent
Simon's reagent
Zwikker reagent
Liebermann reagent

References

Chemical tests
Analytical reagents
Drug testing reagents